"Final Masquerade" is a song by American rock band Linkin Park. The song was originally recorded by the band for their sixth studio album, The Hunting Party, where it appears as the eleventh track on the album and serves as the fifth and final single. The song premiered on MTV on June 8, 2014. The song was produced by Mike Shinoda and Brad Delson, and co-produced by Emile Haynie.

An acoustic version of the song was released for digital download on February 19, 2015.

Composition
"Final Masquerade" has been described as an alternative rock and a hard rock song. In an article from Metal Hammer, it was explained as "more like A Thousand Suns than Hybrid Theory, which Linkin Park gives at their most controlled, meditative, a slowly unfurling, mid-paced anthem built around simmering keyboards, unfussy, low-tempo beats and palm-muted guitar. The song features one of Chester Bennington's finest vocal performances on the album."

MTV described the song as "a sharp, edgy, lushly harmonic heavy-hitter that falls perfectly in line with Linkin Park’s lengthy string of hulking, hooky hits." In an interview with MTV, Shinoda explained:

Music video 
The official music video for the song, directed by Mark Pellington, was released on July 29, 2014 for premiere on MTV. A lyric video for the song was released earlier, as it debuted through Linkin Park's official Facebook page and in digital download format on June 10, 2014.

As of December 2022, the music video for "Final Masquerade" has over 120 million views on YouTube.

Reception
In the track-by-track review by Billboard, the song is given a positive response and explained as, "Synths and palm-muted guitars carry the mid-tempo verses into a head-nodding hard rock chorus. With that, another love affair ends in epic fashion, and there's even a big stadium sing-along."

Accolades
The song was voted as the second-best rock song on the Kerrang!'s rock 100 list. The song was placed after their another song "In the End".

Track listing

Personnel
Linkin Park
 Chester Bennington – lead vocals
 Rob Bourdon – drums, percussion
 Brad Delson – lead guitar, backing vocals
 Dave "Phoenix" Farrell – bass guitar, backing vocals 
 Joe Hahn ("Mr. Hahn") - samples, programming
 Mike Shinoda – backing vocals, rhythm guitar, keyboards

Charts

Release history

References

2014 songs
2014 singles
2010s ballads
Warner Records singles
Linkin Park songs
Hard rock ballads
Music videos directed by Mark Pellington
Songs written by Mike Shinoda
Songs written by Emile Haynie
Song recordings produced by Emile Haynie
American hard rock songs